Tmesorrhina is a genus of  beetles from the family Scarabaeidae, subfamily Cetoniinae.

List of species
 Tmesorrhina alpestris Kolbe, 1892 
 Tmesorrhina barombina Kolbe, 1892 
 Tmesorrhina chireyi Legrand & Antoine, 2003 
 Tmesorrhina ganglbaueri Moser, 1913 
 Tmesorrhina garnieri Allard, 1993 
 Tmesorrhina iris Fabricius, 1781 
 Tmesorrhina laeta Moser, 1913 
 Tmesorrhina laevis Kraatz, 1897 
 Tmesorrhina lequeuxi Antoine, 1995 
 Tmesorrhina pectoralis Moser, 1905 
 Tmesorrhina pilosipes Allard, 1988 
 Tmesorrhina runsorica Arrow, 1909 
 Tmesorrhina simillima Kraatz, 1880 
 Tmesorrhina tridens Duvivier, 1891 
 Tmesorrhina viridicincta Moser, 1913 
 Tmesorrhina viridicyanea Moser, 1902

References
 Encyclopedia of Life
 Flower-beetles

Cetoniinae